The 1991 PBA Third Conference Finals was the best-of-5 basketball championship series of the 1991 PBA Third Conference, and the conclusion of the conference's playoffs. The Alaska Milkmen and Ginebra San Miguel played for the 50th championship contested by the league.

Alaska Milk won their first PBA title after five years, winning their finals series against Ginebra San Miguel, 3 games to 1.

Qualification

Series scoring summary

Games summary

Game 1

Sean Chambers hit all of the Milkmen's last seven points and highlighted the stirring performance with a daring drive with six seconds left. Wes Matthews banged in a triple that tied the count at 90-all with 18 seconds to go, Chito Loyzaga shoved Ginebra ahead, 92–91, with two free throws. Alaska sued for time with 15 seconds remaining and Sean Chambers took matters into his own hands and drove in for the marginal basket.

Game 2

Wes Matthews canned in two free throws for a 107–103 lead that capped his team's long-game struggle. Ginebra trailed by 13 points, 63–76, with 3:15 left in the third quarter. Wes Matthews scored on a rare four-point play to tie the count at 93-all with 5:05 remaining in the game. With the score at 103–101 in favor of Ginebra, following Leo Isaac's 20-footer from left quartercourt with 30 seconds to go, the next play turned out to be controversial, Jojo Lastimosa's attempt bounced high off the rim with Paul Alvarez tipping the ball in, referee Bay Ledesma nullified the basket and giving the Gins possession with time down to 15 seconds, Rudy Distrito knocked in two more charities for a 105–101 advantage for Ginebra.

Game 3

Alaska stormed ahead, 88–73 on a 14–3 run, the Milkmen open gaps as wide as 23 points, 107–84, halfway through the final period. Alaska reserves Nandy Garcia and Roehl Gomez put on fine performances, outdoing themselves on the scoring end with Gomez hitting two straight triples in the fourth quarter.

Game 4

Wes Matthews was limited to only one field goal in the second half and was shut out in the last 2:27 of the game when Ginebra came to within three points at 90–93. Dondon Ampalayo muffed in a finger roll and a three-pointer, allowing Sean Chambers to knock in a running bank shot for a 95–90 count for Alaska. Paul Alvarez sealed the win for the Milkmen with a pair of free throws with time down to 18 seconds.

Rosters

Broadcast notes

References

External links
PBA official website

1991 PBA season
1991
Alaska Aces (PBA) games
Barangay Ginebra San Miguel games
PBA Third Conference Finals